

Buildings and structures

Buildings

 1590
 Sinan Pasha Mosque in Damascus, Syria, is completed.
 Court theatre at Sabbioneta (begun 1588), designed by Vincenzo Scamozzi, is completed.
 Church of Tolentini, Venice, Italy, is designed by Vincenzo Scamozzi; it will not be completed until 1714.
 1590–1595 – Belvedere (fort) in Florence, Italy, designed by Bernardo Buontalenti, is constructed.
 1590–1597 – Hardwick Hall in Derbyshire, England, designed by Robert Smythson, is constructed.
 1591
 Rialto Bridge in Venice, designed by Antonio da Ponte, is completed.
 Church of San Salvatore in Lauro in Rome is designed by Ottaviano Nonni.
 1592 – Fushimi Castle in Kyoto, Japan was begun.
 1592 – Church of Il Redentore on Giudecca in Venice, designed by Andrea Palladio, is consecrated.
 1596 – Villa Ferretti in the Veneto, designed by Vincenzo Scamozzi, is built.
 1596? – Kasthamandap temple in Kathmandu, Nepal.
 1593–1597 – Rushton Triangular Lodge in Northamptonshire, England, is designed and constructed by Sir Thomas Tresham, symbolising his Catholic recusancy.
 1597
 Villa Molin in the Veneto, designed by Vincenzo Scamozzi, is completed.
 Newark Castle on the Firth of Clyde in Scotland is rebuilt.
 Ālī Qāpū imperial palace, Isfahan, Iran, is first used ceremonially.
 1599 – In Padua (Veneto), renovation begins on the Palazzo del Capitaniato arch and clock tower (expanded 1599–1605).

Events
 1590: Giovanni Antonio Rusconi's Della architettura is published posthumously in Venice.
 1592: May 23 – Japanese invasions of Korea (1592–98) begin, leading to the destruction by fire of many Korean buildings.

Births
 1591: December 22 – Tommaso Dingli, Maltese architect (died 1666)
 1596
 November 1 – Pietro da Cortona, Italian baroque architect and painter (died 1669)
 Francesco Buonamici, Italian Baroque architect, painter and engraver (died 1677)
 1598
 January 13 – François Mansart, French baroque architect (died 1666)
 December 7 – Gian Lorenzo Bernini, Italian baroque architect, sculptor and painter (died 1680)
 Baldassarre Longhena, Venetian baroque architect (died 1682)
 1599: September 25 – Francesco Borromini, Ticinese-born baroque architect (died 1667)

Deaths
 1592: April 13 – Bartolomeo Ammannati, Italian architect and sculptor (born 1511)
 c.1592 – Girolamo Cassar, Maltese architect (born c.1520)
 1595 – Antonio da Ponte, Swiss-born Venetian architect (born 1512)
 1597: January 15 – Juan de Herrera, Spanish architect and geometrician (born 1530)

References

Architecture